Ashish Kumar Chhabra is a member of the Chhattisgarh Legislative Assembly representing the Bemetara (Vidhan Sabha constituency) of Chhattisgarh. He got 74914 votes during the election.

References

External links 

Profile on Chhattisgarh Legislative Assembly website

1981 births
Living people
Chhattisgarh MLAs 2018–2023
Indian National Congress politicians from Chhattisgarh